The Castelldefels School of Telecommunications and Aerospace Engineering is a higher educational establishment on Baix Llobregat Campus in Castelldefels, Catalonia, Spain. It is part of the Technical University of Catalonia (UPC) and offers courses in aeronautics and telecommunications.

Degrees

Bachelor degrees (4 years, 240 ECTS)
Bachelor's degree in Air Navigation Engineering
Bachelor's degree in Airports Engineering
Bachelor's degree in Telecommunication Systems
Bachelor's degree in Network Engineering

Master degrees
MASTEAM: Master of Science in Telecommunication Engineering & Management (taught in English)(120 ECTS)
MAST: Master in Aerospace Science and Technology (taught in English)(90 ECTS)
GEONAV: Master's degree in Geomatics and Navigation (taught in English)(90 ECTS)
Master's degree in Airports and Air Navigation (taught in English)(60 ECTS)
Master's degree in Applications and Technologies for Unmanned Aircraft Systems (Drones)-(taught in English)(60 ECTS)

PhD
MASTEAM offers a specific itinerary oriented to research and PhD degree programs
DOCTA: PhD program in Aerospace Science and Technology

Quality in teaching
Since its creation in 1991, the School has been committed to high quality management and teaching. The EETAC was awarded the Certificate of Quality ISO 9001:2000 which was renewed in 2005.  The Catalan Agència per la Qualitat del Sistema Universitari (AQU) granted two distinction awards to the EETAC. In addition the school was awarded the Prize Vicens Vives twice (1996 and 2004) and the Flyer Prize in 2006.

Project-based learning
In 2001 the School opened its master's degree in Telecommunication Engineering, with a curriculum fully based on a project-based learning strategy, with a structure similar to that used by Aalborg University (Denmark). This consists of a two-year, 3000 hour program (1500 hours per year), of which 1800 are devoted to project development. Typically, one semester is formed by two blocks or learning units, each block formed by a multidisciplinary project and one or two courses closely connected with the project. The project is developed by students working in teams of 4-6 students.

Research at the EETAC
Some departments of the university have groups of investigation that develop their activities in the EETAC, fundamentally in the following subjects: 
Astronomy and Astrophyshics
Broadband Networks and Services
Control, Monitoring and Communications
Distributed Systems Architectures
Instrumentation, Sensors and Interfaces
Intelligent Communications and Avionics
Microgravity and Modelization
Microwaves
Mobile and Radio Communications
Optical Communications
Photonics
Satellite Systems
Security and Networking
Wireless Networks

EETAC and the Baix Llobregat Campus 

The EETAC is part of the Baix Llobregat Campus, a Campus of the Technical University of Catalonia which is located alongside the Mediterranean Technology Park (PMT).

The PMT is a science and technology park that was set up by the Autonomous Government of Catalonia, the Regional Council of Baix Llobregat, the Castelldefels City Council and the Technical University of Catalonia. The PMT aims to create links between educational institutions, research centres, high tech companies and technology-based spin-off companies.

Centers of public investigation in the PMT: 
 Centre Tecnològic i de les Telecomunicacions de Catalunya (CTTC)
 ICFO-The Institute of Photonic Sciences
 Institut de Geomàtica (IdeG)
 International Center for Numerical Methods in Engineering (CIMNE)
 Internet Interdisciplinary Institute (IN3)
 i2CAT Foundation

Companies in the PMT: 
 Nortel
 Tempos 21
 Ingenia
 Futur Echo

References

External links
EETAC web site
UPC web site

Engineering universities and colleges in Spain
Education in Barcelona
Universities in Catalonia
Polytechnic University of Catalonia